The Guiding Light (known since 1975 as Guiding Light) was an American television soap opera.


Show development
On June 30, 1952, The Guiding Light began airing on CBS television.  From June 30, 1952 to June 29, 1956, The Guiding Light ran on both CBS television and radio, with the actors performing, the same scenes but for different audiences, live twice each weekday.  The live television performances were in the morning, and then in the afternoon the actors read for the live radio show.  On July 2, 1956, The Guiding Light became a CBS television show, only, and the show no longer was heard on radio.  Episodes continued at 15 minutes in length.

In 1953, CBS strongly persuaded Irna Phillips to let The Guiding Light experiment with television's first color broadcast.  Phillips was not thrilled with the concept of color television, and thwarted the effort by CBS by having that day's episode take place entirely in a hospital setting with gray walls and white uniforms.  The Guiding Light was broadcast in black and white for the remainder of the decade.

In 1956, Phillips created As the World Turns, which first started airing on April 2, 1956 on CBS. When the workload of writing both that show and The Guiding Light became too much for her, Phillips handed the reins at The Guiding Light to her protégé Agnes Nixon. There is some indication that Procter & Gamble and CBS may have forced Phillips out of writing for The Guiding Light when on the March 31, 1958 episode, popular heroine Katherine "Kathy" Roberts Lang Grant Holden (played by the equally popular Susan Douglas Rubeš) was killed off in a Phillips-created story. Kathy, confined to a wheelchair, was killed after being struck by a car.  CBS was deluged with protest letters.

Prior to the launches of the half-hour shows As the World Turns, and The Edge of Night (both launched the same day), CBS and Procter & Gamble tried to convince Phillips to combine The Guiding Light and Search for Tomorrow into one single half-hour show. Phillips declined.

Major characters

Original television cast (starting June 30, 1952)

 Friedrich "Papa" Bauer (Theo Goetz to end of decade)
 Meta Bauer White Roberts Banning (Jone Allison to November 14, 1952)
 Bill Bauer (Lyle Sudrow to June 29, 1956)
 Bert Bauer (Charita Bauer to end of decade)
 Trudy Bauer Palmer (Helen Wagner to August 22, 1952)
 Reverend Dr. Paul Keeler (Ed Begley to November 1952)
 Joe Roberts (Herbert "Herb" Nelson to December 24, 1955), character died of a heart attack.
 Katherine "Kathy" Roberts Lang Grant Holden (Susan Douglas Rubeš, to March 31, 1958), character killed off.
 Joey Roberts (Tarry Green to September 1953)
 Dr. Richard "Dick" Grant, Jr. (James Lipton to end of decade)
 Bob Lang, Kathy's first husband, father of Robin, killed off
 Richard Grant, Sr. (Ed Prentiss to 1954), written out
 Clyde Palmer, Trudy's husband, character talked about but not seen

Replaced original television cast members

 Meta Bauer White Roberts Banning (Ellen Demming, January 5, 1953 to end of decade)
 Reverend Dr. Paul Keeler (Melville Ruick to 1954)
 Joey Roberts (Richard Holland to December 1953), written out.
 Trudy Bauer Palmer (Lisa Howard, March 14, 1957 to March 14, 1958)
 Bill Bauer (Ed Bryce, November 1959 to end of decade)

Other characters

 Gloria La Rue Harper (Anne Burr McDermott, November 1952 to April 1954), written out
 Sid Harper (Philip Sterling, November 1952 to April 1954), written out
 Richard Hanley (Mandel Kramer, January 1953 to December 1955, then October 1959 to end of decade)
 Janet Johnson (Ruth Warrick, March 1953 to October 1954; Lois Wheeler, October 1954 to September 1956, then May 1957 to August 1958), written out
 Peggy Ashley Regan (Patricia Wheel, May 1953 to March 1955), written out
 Laura Ashley Grant (Katherine Anderson, 1953; Alice Yourman, 1953 to 1956), written out
 Michael "Mike" Bauer (Glenn Walken & Christopher Walken, January 12, 1954 to June 22, 1956; Michael Allen, 1957 to end of decade), eldest son of Bill and Bert Bauer, born in March 1952
 Robin Lang Holden (Zina Bethune, May 1956 to April 1958; Judy Robinson, April 1959 to end of decade), daughter of Kathy and Bob Lang, adopted by Dick Grant and then by Mark Holden, born May 3, 1953
 William "Billy" Edward Bauer, Jr. (Pat Collins, from 1958 to end of decade), second son of Bill and Bert Bauer, born on December 31, 1954
 Lila Taylor Kelly (Nancy Wickwire, 1954 to January 1956; Teri Keane, December 1957), written out
 Dr. Jim Kelly (Paul Potter, 1954 to January 1956), written out
 Dr. John Brooks (Charles Baxter, 1954–1955), written out
 Dr. Bart Thompson (Barry Thomson, 1954), written out
 Dan Peters (Paul Ballantyne, 1954), written out
 Mrs. Laurey (Lois Wilson, January 1954 to December 1955; Virginia Payne, January to April 1956), the landlady of the apartment building that Marie Wallace and Dr. Dick Grant lived in located in New York City, written out
 Marie Wallace Grant (Joyce Holden, January to December 1954; Lynne Rogers, December 1954 to end of decade)
 Mark Holden (Whitfield Connor, October 1955 to March 1956, then August 1957 to end of decade)
 Dr. Paul Fletcher (Michael Kane, January 1956 to April 1956; Bernard Grant, May 1956 to end of decade)
 Elise Miller Franklin (Ethel Remey, 1956 to 1957). Bert and Alma-Jean's mother. Elise's 2nd husband Albert Franklin died offscreen in Arizona.
 Alma-Jean Miller, talked about but never seen. Youngest daughter of Elise Miller. Bert Bauer's Younger sister.
 Dr. Bruce Banning (Lester "Les" Damon, January 1956 to end of decade)
 Alice Holden (Sandy Dennis, May to June 1956; Diane Gentner, July 1956 to April 1958; Lin Pearson, April to December 1958 and May 1959), written out
 Anne Benedict Fletcher (Joan Gray, July 1956 to end of decade)
 Ruth Jannings Holden (Irja Jensen, January to June 1958; Louise Platt, June 1958 to September 1959; Virginia Dwyer, September 1959 to end of decade)
 Fred Fletcher (John Gibson, January to February 1958), Dr. Paul Fletcher's biological father, written out
 Marian Winters Lipsey (Katherine Meskill, January 1958 to June 1958), Dr. Paul Fletcher's mother, written out
 John Lipsey, character talked about but never seen, Dr. Paul Fletcher's adoptive father and husband to Marian Winters
 Henry Benedict (John Gibson, March 1958 to end of decade)
 Helene Benedict (Kay Campbell, April 1957 to 1964)
 Amy Sinclair (Joanne Linville, January 1959 to December 1959)
 Nora Sinclair AKA Marie Grant, talked about but not seen, Amy's daughter who Dick and Marie Grant adopted not realizing Nora/Marie was part of Joe Turino's illegal adoption scam ring
 Karl Jannings (Richard Morse, September 1959 to end of decade)
 Joe Turino (Joseph Campanella, December 1959 to end of decade)

Plot development
In the late 1940s, the show's focus shifted to the Bauer family, who lived in Selby Flats, a fictional suburb of Los Angeles. The family was led by the patriarch, Friedrich "Papa" Bauer, who immigrated from Germany and imparted his wisdom to his three children: William "Bill" Edward, Meta, and Gertrude "Trudy." The original storyline followed Meta's career in modeling under the name Jan Carter, her romance with Theodore "Ted" White, and her decision to give their son up for adoption. Eventually, Jan and Ted married and won custody of their son, Charles "Chuckie," but their relationship became violent, leading to a custody battle that Meta won. However, during one of Ted's visitation outings, Chuckie died in a freak boxing accident.

Meta shocked the Bauer family and viewers when she shot and killed Ted in 1950. On the radio show, listeners voted to acquit Meta of the murder due to temporary insanity. The Brandon family and the doctors faded into obscurity, and Trudy married Clyde Palmer and moved to New York. The television show's first decade focuses on conflicts between the Bauer family and Bill's wife, Bert, including Bill's alcoholism and career difficulties. In 1951, Bill has an affair with singer Gloria LaRue, who is also an alcoholic, and nearly divorces Bert. However, Bert refuses to let him go and becomes pregnant, while Gloria gets sober and marries her manager Sid Harper. The Bauers stabilize with Bill and Bert together and expecting their first child.

In 1952, Bert gives birth to a boy named Michael. Bill keeps it secret from Bert as he signs Gloria LaRue Harper to a new TV contract, which angers Bert and Sid. Gloria develops vocal problems and moves to New York City with Sid. In 1953, Meta's new stepdaughter and former roommate cause complications. Joe, a newspaper reporter who championed Meta's acquittal in her murder trial, falls in love with her, but Kathy, his daughter from a previous marriage, does not like her. Joe and Meta get married secretly, with only Trudy and Clyde knowing. Meta and Joe plan to live separately until they win over Kathy, but Meta struggles to get along with her when they return to Los Angeles.

Kathy struggles with her own romantic issues and is secretly involved with an older mechanic, Bob Lang. While in the hospital, Kathy meets Dr. Richard Grant Jr., who proposes to her but backs off due to his mother's disapproval. Kathy overhears Meta and Joe talking about their wedding and gets angry. She moves in with a friend, Alice Graham, and agrees to marry Bob after discovering she is pregnant. Joe has Kathy's marriage to Bob annulled and encourages her to divorce him, but Kathy refuses. She resumes dating Dick, and Bob tries to woo her back. Alice is the only one who knows about Kathy's affairs, and Meta goes to New York City again.

On a date with Bob Lang in 1952, Kathy narrowly escapes death after he dies in a car crash. Kathy is pregnant and unsure of what to do, but Dick marries her to protect her from legal trouble over Bob's death. Bert and Bill Bauer, Kathy's new relatives, become involved in the situation, as does Kathy's former roommate Alice Graham, who threatens to reveal information about the accident. Kathy is put on trial for Bob's murder in 1953 but is acquitted when evidence is revealed that another mechanic had claimed to repair the brakes on Bob's car when he had not. Meanwhile, Joe, Meta, and Joey fade into supporting roles as Kathy and Dick's romantic troubles take center stage. Joe dies in 1955, and Joey disappears from the story after Joe's funeral. Meta and Kathy bond over their shared grief.

Bill gets a new job at an advertising agency, but it keeps him away from his family and Selby Flats. Bert is happy when they buy a home in Hollywood Hills. Papa moves in with them and Bert relies on his advice. Bert takes Michael to a psychologist because he feels abandoned by Bill. The psychologist agrees that Bill needs to spend more time with Michael, so Bill takes Michael on a trip and they bond. Bert gives birth to their second son, Billy. Bert's mother, Elsie Miller, moves in but causes chaos before she leaves with a new man. Michael doesn't like Elsie and starts to go by Mike.

Kathy's marriage to Dr. Dick Grant takes exciting twists and turns. She gives birth to Robin, Bob Lang's child, after a difficult hospitalization. Dick agrees to adopt Robin despite his mother's protest, but Kathy's internal infection causes her to hallucinate that someone is out to get her and her new husband. Private nurse Janet Johnson is hired to care for Kathy and takes a liking to Dick, encouraged by Laura. As Kathy's health improves, so does her marriage to Dick, until he faces personal and professional crises at work. Dick leaves Cedars and Los Angeles for New York City, where he meets artist Marie Wallace, his new love interest. Eventually, Kathy seeks a divorce due to Dick's abandonment of affection. Cedars hires a new surgeon Dr. Paul Fletcher, and Marie almost has an affair with him when she learns she can't get pregnant. Paul discovers his biological father's identity and forgives him before his death. Anne Benedict enters Paul's life and helps him realize he deserves love. Anne and Paul get married, and she gives birth to Johnny, winning the approval of her wealthy parents.

In 1959, Dick and Marie Grant unwittingly get caught up in Joe Turino's illegal adoption scam ring. They adopt a daughter named Marie, previously named Nora, who was born to a runaway drug addict named Amy Sinclair. The adoption is later revealed to be a part of Turino's scam, and they lose custody of Marie to Amy in 1960. Dick and Marie give Amy money to hide from Turino and skip town. They later adopt a boy named Phillip Collins in the fall of 1960 and leave town with him in 1962.

Meta starts dating Mark Holden, a wealthy structural engineer and friend of her brother-in-law, Clyde Palmer, after Joe Robert's funeral. Bert tries to set Mark up with Meta, but Mark takes a liking to Meta's stepdaughter, Kathy. Dr. Bruce Banning advises Meta to step aside for Mark and Kathy, and they eventually marry. Kathy's daughter, Robin, becomes rebellious and difficult towards Mark, much like she was towards Meta. When Robin wishes that Kathy were still married to Dr. Dick Grant, Dick and Meta talk to her, and she agrees to accept Mark. Mark then agrees to adopt her with Dick's blessing.

Mark's rebellious younger sister, Alice Holden, comes to live with Mark, Kathy, and Robin in Selby Flats. Alice and Robin do not get along, and their constant tension leads to a tragedy for Kathy. Alice sabotages a kitchen chair, hoping to embarrass Robin, but Kathy ends up using it and falls, resulting in a miscarriage and paralysis. Alice is sent away, and Kathy is killed in a bicycling accident in March 1958. Mark is left to raise Robin on his own.

Robin and Mike, now teenagers, begin a serious romantic relationship. However, Robin becomes problematic for Mark and Meta, attempting to break up Meta's relationship with Bruce and persuade her to marry Mark, making her Robin's stepmother. Additionally, Robin shows an immediate dislike towards Mark's new romantic partner, widow, and housekeeper Ruth Jannings.

On New Year's Eve in 1959, Robin learns that she can't control everything when she visits Mark's hotel and discovers he has married Ruth and they are on their honeymoon. Matters worsen for Robin when she goes to Mark's hotel room and Ruth answers the door. In 1960, Robin causes more trouble by getting involved romantically with both Mike Bauer and Karl Jannings, Ruth's son.

References

Guiding Light
Television articles with incorrect naming style